The 2014 Women's World Open Squash Championship is the women's edition of the 2014 World Championships, which serves as the individual world championship for squash players. The event took place in Cairo, Egypt from December 15 to 20, 2014. Nicol David won her eighth World Open title, beating Raneem El Weleily in the final.

Prize money and ranking points
For 2014, the prize purse was $150,000. The prize money and points breakdown is as follows:

Seeds

Draw and results

See also
World Championship
2014 Men's World Open Squash Championship
2014 Women's World Team Squash Championships

References

External links
WSA World Championship 2014 website
SquashSite World Championship 2014 page

World Squash Championships
W
Squash tournaments in Egypt
2014 in Egyptian sport
2014 in women's squash
International sports competitions hosted by Egypt